The M-50 orbital motorway is the outermost ring road of Madrid and its metropolitan area. It has a length of 85 km and, unlike the other ring roads, doesn't form a closed ring, lacking a connection in the northwest between A-6 and A-1. It runs at an average distance of 13.5 km from the Puerta del Sol. Currently it is the longest beltway in the Madrid region, and may be compared with London's M25 motorway and Berlin's A10 beltway.

It is managed by the central government. Its construction was financed using a shadow toll system, paid with the tolls collected from the motorways R-2, R-3, R-4 and R-5.

Nomenclature 

The M-50 name was chosen as the highway is theoretically the fifth ring road in Madrid.

The first ring is formed by the streets that follow the route of Felipe IV's wall of Madrid along the streets known as the Rondas (Ronda de Segovia, Ronda de Toledo, Ronda de Valencia, Ronda de Atocha) and the Bulevares (Génova, Sagasta, Carranza, Alberto Aguilera, Marqués de Urquijo) and the roads linking both.

The second ring is formed by the boundaries of Madrid's 19th Century Ensanche, following the proposed Paseo de Ronda.

Finally, the third and fourth rings are, respectively, M-30 and M-40.

History 

The highway was begun in 1990, one from the A-4 up to Getafe to M-409 at Fuenlabrada, this section was known with "Way of Culebro" for a nearby stream. This is the southern section of road. Another section was also built from Majadahonda to the A-6 at  Las Rozas, as part of the highway M-503, to be subsequently incorporated into the M-50. Later, it was when it was extended from the A-4 to A-3 and then to the A-1 at San Sebastián de los Reyes and completing the section A-4-Majadahonda in 2002 .

Since the discovery in 2003 of a field of flint mines in Vicálvaro, work was stopped between the M-45 and A-3. After finally modifying the path slightly, on 26 June 2007 the section was completed between the A-3 and M-45 .

Regional politicians of the Autonomous Government of Madrid have considered ending the ring between the A-6 and A-1, passing under El Pardo by building a tunnel and toll highway, independent of M-50; but for now, the drafting and subsequent implementation of a project in this regard, remains the responsibility of the General Directorate of Roads of the Ministry of Development, being the road is in the State Highway Network.

Route 
Localities and main route of M-50:

 San Sebastián de los Reyes A-1
 Aeropuerto de Madrid-Barajas R-2
 Paracuellos de Jarama M-111
 Ajalvir M-113
 R-2
 INTA M-115
 Torrejón de Ardoz A-2
 Coslada Autopista M-21
 San Fernando de Henares M-206
 Autopista M-45
 R-3
 Rivas-Vaciamadrid A-3
 M-31
 Perales del Río M-301
 Pinto A-4
 R-4
 Getafe Autovía A-42
 Leganés. Fuenlabrada M-409
 Parque de Polvoranca M-407
 Autopista de peaje R-5
 Móstoles M-506
 Alcorcón
 A-5
 M-506
 Villaviciosa de Odón
 Boadilla del Monte M-501
 Majadahonda M-503
 Las Rozas de Madrid M-505
 A-6

Exits

References 

Transport in Madrid
Transport in the Community of Madrid
Ring roads in Spain